Frederick Cavendish may refer to:
 Lord Frederick Cavendish (1836–1882), English Liberal politician
 Lord Frederick Cavendish (British Army officer) (1729–1803), British field marshal and Whig politician

See also
 Frederick Cavendish Ponsonby, British military officer